Bridge over Troubled Water is a 1970 album by Simon & Garfunkel

Bridge over Troubled Water may also refer to:
"Bridge over Troubled Water" (song), the title track from the album
Bridge over Troubled Water (Paul Desmond album), an album of Simon and Garfunkel songs by Paul Desmond
Bridge over Troubled Water (Peggy Lee album), an album by Peggy Lee